Gangeyabhushani (pronounced gāngæyabhūshani) is a ragam in Carnatic music (musical scale of South Indian classical music). It is the 33rd Melakarta rāgam in the 72 melakarta rāgam system of Carnatic music.

It is called Gangātarangini in Muthuswami Dikshitar school of Carnatic music.

Structure and Lakshana

It is the 3rd rāgam in the 6th chakra Rutu. The mnemonic name is Rutu-Go. The mnemonic phrase is sa ru gu ma pa dha nu. Its  structure (ascending and descending scale) is as follows (see swaras in Carnatic music for details on below notation and terms):
: 
: 

The notes present in this scale are shatsruthi rishabham, antara gandharam, shuddha madhyamam, shuddha dhaivatham, kakali nishadham.

As it is a melakarta rāgam, by definition it is a sampoorna rāgam (has all seven notes in ascending and descending scale). It is the shuddha madhyamam equivalent of Dhatuvardani, which is the 69th melakarta.

Janya rāgams 
Gangeyabhushani currently has no janya rāgams (derived scales) associated with it. See List of janya rāgams to look up all janya rāgams.

Compositions
A few compositions set to Gangeyabhooshani are:

Sulabha Poojeya Maadi by Purandara Dasaru
Varadaraja avava by Muthuswami Dikshitar
Ninaikanome by Koteeswara Iyer
Paalayasumam by M. Balamuralikrishna
Evvare ramayya by Tyagaraja

Related rāgams
This section covers the theoretical and scientific aspect of this rāgam.

Gangeyabhushani's notes when shifted using Graha bhedam, yields Neetimati, a minor melakarta rāgam. Graha bhedam is the step taken in keeping the relative note frequencies same, while shifting the shadjam to the next note in the rāgam. For further details and an illustration refer Graha bhedam on Gangeyabhushani.

Notes

References

Melakarta ragas